Graham Nerlich (1929-2022) was an Australian philosopher. He was a Research Fellow of Philosophy at the University of Adelaide, and his expertise was in the areas of philosophy; existence of God; meaning of life; mind and body; ethics; and philosophy of science.

Graham Nerlich was a Fellow of the Australian Academy of the Humanities Nerlich also served on the council of the International union of history and philosophy of science division of logic, methodology and philosophy of science (DLMPS) from 1987 to 1991.

Life and career
Nerlich graduated Bachelor of Arts with joint honours in Philosophy and English Literature in 1954 and a Master of Arts in 1955, both at University of Adelaide. Then B. Phil, University of Oxford, 1956–1958 with a thesis on Personal Identity, with J. L. Austin, as supervisor and friend. He was Lecturer University of Leicester, England, 1958−1961; University of Sydney, Senior Lecturer 1962–1968; Associate Professor, 1968−1972; Professor, 1972−1973; University of Adelaide, Hughes Professor of Philosophy, 1974−1994; Emeritus Professor 1995.

He was Principal Editor of the Australasian Journal of Philosophy, 1968–72, and appointed Founder of the Minkowski Institute, 2013.

He was the invited speaker at the International union of history and philosophy of science division of logic, methodology and philosophy of science (IUHPS/DLMPS) Australian delegation at the General Assemblies in Moscow (1987), and Uppsala (1991).

Other activities
First convenor University of Adelaide’s Committee on Ethics, of experimentation on humans, Member for the University of Adelaide of committees for the ethics of experiments on animals, and for the Institute of Medical and Veterinary Science South Australia, and SA Pathology, a couple of decades of each till 2017.

Thespian activities
Graham was a keen actor mainly in amateur theatre; Theatre Guild, and Independent Theatre, where he met Margaret Rawlinson, the stage manager and married her. Professional appearances with South Australian State Theatre Co, a couple of  small television and film appearances and narrations. Particularly interested in Shakespearean parts – played Ferdinand in Tempest, and later, same play, as Prospero, also Shylock, King Lear and Polonius. He also appeared in several modern plays e.g. Jumpers by Tom Stoppard and Harold Pinter's The Birthday Party.

Humanist
Nerlich has never had a religious faith, and is opposed to religions generally as they are liable to promote commandment ethics and as influential but misleading falsehoods and dogmas; he wrote on this theme the article on 'Popular arguments for the existence of God' in the 1967 Encyclopedia of Philosophy. He was patron of the South Australian Humanist Society (now defunct), and of Voluntary Assisted Dying South Australia, which helped to change the relevant South Australian law on this in 2021.

Move to University of Adelaide
At Sydney University, Nerlich as head of the Philosophy Department had difficulty in containing the "Sydney philosophy disturbances", in which political differences between left and right created heated conflict over proposed new courses in Marxism-Leninism and over democratisation.
When J. J. C. Smart left Adelaide University in 1972, Nerlich moved to Adelaide to take the chair. 1974 saw the beginning of significant changes in administrative style at Adelaide University. Headship of the Department was no longer tied to occupancy of the Chair. It became an elected position independent of academic rank. Nerlich was elected immediately and quickly moved to allow student representation at staff meetings, among other democratic measures. These changes have persisted, and were instituted not only in Philosophy but also in the University generally.  Nerlich’s research and publication in his two decades in the Hughes Chair was divided mainly between studies in the ontology of space, time and space-time, and ethics. In the former and larger output he defended realism toward space-time and especially a unique role for it in ontology as providing geometrical, non-causal explanation in General Relativity. Geometric non-causal explanation was also argued to figure in the explanation of incongruent counterparts and the failure of similarity geometry in non-Euclidean space. Nerlich’s interest in the philosophy of physics had been stimulated earlier by Smart, and both have enjoyed good relations with the physics departments.

Publications

Books 
 2009, The Shape of Space. This is a revised and updated edition of Graham Nerlich's classic book (1976). It develops a metaphysical account of space that treats it as a real and concrete entity, showing that shape plays a key explanatory role in space and spacetime theories. James Franklin agrees, 'It is hard to believe the question makes sense for something that does not really exist.'
 1990, Values and Valuing: Speculations on the Ethical Life of Persons. Nerlich concludes that valuing will be good only if it results in objective values that are authentic to the individual's nature and surrounding culture.
 1994, What Spacetime Explains: Metaphysical Essays,
 2013, Einstein's Genie Spacetime out of the Bottle,
 2014 , Never Mind about the Bourgeoisie: The Correspondence Between Iris Murdoch and Brian Medlin 1976-1995,

Articles

References 

1929 births
20th-century Australian philosophers
21st-century Australian philosophers
Philosophers of science
Australian atheists
Academic staff of the University of Adelaide
Fellows of the Australian Academy of the Humanities
Living people